Gravity's Rainbow is the ninth studio album and tenth album overall by American singer Pat Benatar. It was released in 1993 on Chrysalis Records. The album is named after, though bears little other relation to, Thomas Pynchon's 1973 novel of the same name. It peaked at No. 85 on the US Billboard 200, Gravity's Rainbow would be Benatar's last studio album recorded for Chrysalis.

Track listing

Singles

Personnel

Band members
Pat Benatar – vocals, executive producer
Neil Giraldo – guitar, keyboards, percussion, executive producer
Frank Linx – bass, percussion
Myron Grombacher – drums, percussion

Additional musicians
Greg Piccolo – saxophone on "Crazy"
Richard Dodd – cello on "Somebody's Baby"
Donte Scher – violin on "Somebody's Baby"

Production
Don Gehman – producer, engineer
Rick Will – engineer, mixing of "Tradin' Down"
Ed Thacker – mixing
Danny Alonso – mix assistant
Sheldon and Nicholas Devane – mixing of "Pictures of a Gone World" and "Rise (Part 2)"
Stephen Marcussen – mastering

Charts

Album

Singles

References

1993 albums
Pat Benatar albums
Albums produced by Don Gehman
Chrysalis Records albums